Lilliana Belle Ketchman (born June 23, 2008), known professionally as  Lilly K, is an American YouTuber, model, dancer and aspiring actress. She is known for her appearances on Lifetime's Dance Moms beginning in season six, and for her YouTube videos.

Early life
Lilliana Ketchman was born June 23, 2008 in Fayetteville, North Carolina to Stacey and Christopher Ketchman and has an older brother, Caden. Her mother is a psychologist and dancer while her father is a piano player and psychologist. Her family is from Fayetteville, North Carolina, where she attended Campaneria Ballet School. Ketchman began dancing when she was two years old and started competing at age four.

Career

YouTube
In 2015, Ketchman launched her YouTube channel, which features videos of her competitions, dance routines, cooking, fashion & beauty tips, games, and her many pranks. Her channel has more than three million subscribers and 288 million views. Dance Moms Abby Lee Miller became aware of Ketchman via her social media presence.

Dance Moms
When she was participating in a photo shoot in New York in 2015, someone suggested she should be on Dance Moms with Abby Lee Miller; Ketchman's mother, however, put off the idea of auditioning due to Miller's reputation. After Miller began following Ketchman on social media, Ketchman was asked to send videos of her dancing. She joined season six of Dance Moms as part of the Abby Lee Dance Company (ALDC) mini team at the age of seven. Ketchman's first solo was "Step by Step", which placed first. In 2017, she joined the ALDC Elite team. Ketchman placed first in the junior division at the national competition. During season seven, Ketchman placed first in a Spokane, Washington, competition with the ALDC.

The only team member to return for season eight, Ketchman won the overall competition for week 14 with her solo "Black Widow". For her solo "Straight Up" aired during week 16, she performed the entire routine in a straitjacket, earning a perfect score of 300 and finishing first. During the national competition, Ketchman placed second in the junior division and fourth overall with her solo "Inside Out".

Music
Ketchman has appeared in numerous music videos for artists including Bianca Ryan, Sia, and fellow Dance Moms alumnus JoJo Siwa. In Sia's music video of "Move Your Body", Ketchman's portrayal of a young Sia received critical acclaim. Slate said her moves were what made the music video "so much fun to watch". In November 2020, Ketchman and her mother teased her own single and music video, "Underneath".

JoJo Siwa controversy
JoJo Siwa's video for her song "Nonstop" featured children portraying circus animals. Ketchman was made up as a monkey, leading to widespread controversy over the use of "blackface", which Siwa denied.

See also
 List of dancers

References

External links
 
 

2008 births
21st-century American dancers
American female dancers
American YouTubers
Dancers from North Carolina
Living people
People from Fayetteville, North Carolina
Participants in American reality television series
YouTube channels launched in 2015
21st-century American women